Olve Eikemo (born 27 June 1973), better known by his stage name Abbath Doom Occulta or simply Abbath, is a Norwegian musician best known as a founding member of the black metal band Immortal. Before founding Immortal, Abbath performed with Old Funeral alongside future Immortal member Demonaz. While working with Old Funeral, he also joined Demonaz's band Amputation which later became Immortal. He also plays bass in Demonaz's eponymous project.

Although he is primarily a guitarist, he is also proficient as a bassist and a drummer, having recorded all drums for Immortal albums Pure Holocaust and Battles in the North. Following his departure from Immortal in 2015, he announced that he would be forming a new band under the Abbath name.

Early life
Eikemo was born in Odda and grew up in Lysefjorden in Os just outside Bergen in Norway. As a young boy, he was an avid fan of hard rock band Kiss. His first heavy metal album was Creatures of the Night, which made him feel "immortal". He started his musical career with the band Old Funeral. He cites getting his first Venom video and his first Bathory album as the moment where "that was it" in his musical development.

Projects

Immortal
Immortal's history began in 1989 as death metal band Amputation. At various times throughout Immortal's existence, Abbath was lead vocalist, bassist, guitarist, keyboardist, drummer, and lyricist, mainly due to the inconsistent line-ups they were able to put together. For a long time, however, Abbath served the band as vocalist, bassist and (studio) drummer while Demonaz played lead guitar. It was not until Horgh arrived that Immortal was able to secure a steady line-up, but problems continued. After the release of Blizzard Beasts in 1997, Demonaz was diagnosed with acute tendinitis, and was consequently forced to quit as guitarist, but remained as lyricist and band manager. They released At the Heart of Winter in 1999, this time with Abbath handling guitar and bass, with Horgh still on drums.  This album marks a large shift in sound and style for the music of Immortal.  In 2000 they released Damned in Black, with Iscariah on bass.  Sons of Northern Darkness was released in 2002, with the same lineup.

Soon after the release of Sons of Northern Darkness, Immortal ceased to exist. The break-up was not caused by tensions or problems, but was rather a mutual one between all members, who claimed to do this for personal reasons.

In early June 2006, it was announced through the German Rock Hard magazine that Abbath and Horgh would reunite as Immortal. They began practicing old material. In regard to when Immortal would start playing live again, Abbath said:

They began to tour again, recently playing shows at Wacken Open Air in Germany, and touring for the first time in Australia and New Zealand in March 2008. The newest Immortal album All Shall Fall  was released in September 2009 in Europe with a US release following a month later.

I

In 2006, Abbath started a new band called simply "I". Abbath is the frontman and guitarist of I and is joined by former Immortal drummer Armagedda on drums, Gorgoroth bassist King ov Hell on bass, Enslaved guitarist Arve Isdal on guitars, and former Immortal guitarist Demonaz writing lyrics. The debut album called Between Two Worlds was released in 2006.

ABBATH
After Abbath split with Immortal in 2015, he formed another band, Abbath, taking advantage of his already popular name in the black metal music industry. The band released their first album in early 2016, and played live for the first time at Tuska Open Air 2015.

Bömbers
Bömbers is a Motörhead tribute band formed in 1996. The band consists of Abbath on lead vocals and bass, Tore (ex-Old Funeral) on guitars, and Pez (Punishment Park) on drums. During the Inferno Metal Festival 2007, Abbath joined the German thrash metal band Sodom on stage and performed a cover of Motörhead's "Ace of Spades".

Equipment
As of 2015, Abbath is an endorsee of Schecter Guitars. A signature model was released, called the RavenDark V, in 2017.

Schecter RavenDark V FR Abbath signature model
Schecter Hellraiser Hybrid C-1
Schecter Gary Holt V-1
LTD V-401DX (with Seymour Duncan pickups)
LTD DV8-R (modified to accept a Floyd Rose tremolo system)
GHL Jackson Randy Rhoads copy

Abbath uses an ENGL Ritchie Blackmore Signature E650 amp through either direct line in or a Marshall cabinet.

In popular culture
The character Lars Ümlaüt from the Guitar Hero series of video games features much of the same clothing Abbath wears, and nearly identical corpse paint. The reference is more apparent in Guitar Hero III: Legends of Rock, as Ümlaüt's hair is jet black (rather than blonde) just like Abbath.

Jester King Brewery in Austin, Texas has a character similar to Abbath on the label of their Imperial stout.

Discography

Immortal
 Diabolical Fullmoon Mysticism (1992)
 Pure Holocaust (1993)
 Battles in the North (1995)
 Blizzard Beasts (1997)
 At the Heart of Winter (1999)
 Damned in Black (2000)
 Sons of Northern Darkness (2002)
 All Shall Fall (2009)

I
 Between Two Worlds (2006)

Abbath
 Abbath (2016)
 Outstrider (2019)
 Dread Reaver (2022)

Dimmu Borgir
 Death Cult Armageddon (2003) - backing vocals on "Progenies of the Great Apocalypse" and "Heavenly Perverse"

Enslaved
 Isa (2004) - backing vocals on "Lunar Force"

The Battalion
 Stronghold Of Men (2008) - backing vocals on "Detonate" and "Man To Man (Warfare)"

References

1973 births
Living people
Norwegian heavy metal bass guitarists
Norwegian male bass guitarists
Norwegian black metal musicians
Norwegian heavy metal drummers
Male drummers
Norwegian heavy metal guitarists
Norwegian heavy metal singers
Norwegian multi-instrumentalists
Musicians from Os, Hordaland
Black metal singers
20th-century Norwegian male singers
20th-century Norwegian singers
21st-century Norwegian male singers
21st-century Norwegian singers
20th-century bass guitarists
21st-century Norwegian guitarists
20th-century drummers
21st-century Norwegian drummers
Immortal (band) members
Old Funeral members
21st-century Norwegian bass guitarists
I (band) members
Abbath (band) members
Musicians from Odda